Richard Visser (1968/1969) is a Dutch pastry chef who runs a pastry stand located on the corner of the Heemraadssingel and the Vierambachtsstraat in Rotterdam, which mainly sells oliebollen. In 2011 his oliebollen were named the best in the Netherlands by the Algemeen Dagblad national newspaper in their AD-Oliebollentest; this was his eighth win in nineteen years. He won again in 2013.

See also
 List of pastry chefs

References

External links
 Richard Visser’s Gebakkraam – Let’s have a ball, Spotted by Locals (WebCite archive, Spotted by Locals (WebCite archive)

Living people
Businesspeople from Rotterdam
Dutch chefs
Pastry chefs
Year of birth missing (living people)